Landwehr is a German language surname.

List of people with the surname 

 , mayor of in Vohwinkel 1919–1929
  (born 1968), German historian
 Andreas Landwehr (borb 1959), German journalist
 Brenda Landwehr, American politician
 Gordian Landwehr (1912–1998), German Dominican prior
 Gottfried Landwehr (1929–2013), German physicist
 Heinrich Landwehr (1908–1974), German politician (SPD)
  (1884–1955), German lawyer and ministerial official
  (recorded around 1658–1670), German artist, son of Jürgen Landwehr
  (ca. 1580–1646) German artist
  (born 1935), German company lawyer
  (1897–1981), German politician
 Lutz Landwehr von Pragenau (born 1963), German composer
 Mathis Landwehr (born 1980), German actor
 Richard Landwehr, author of books about the Waffen-SS
 Wilma Landwehr (1913–1981), German politician (SPD)

Surnames
Surnames of German origin
Low German surnames
German toponymic surnames